Ramón Rojas Aranguren (1905 – death date unknown) was a Cuban outfielder in the Negro leagues in the 1930s.

A native of Havana, Cuba, Rojas made his Negro leagues debut in 1931 with the Cuban House of David. He remained with the club the following season as it played under the name "Pollock's Cuban Stars". Rojas finished his career in 1935 with the Cuban Stars (East).

References

External links
 and Baseball-Reference Black Baseball stats and Seamheads

1905 births
Date of birth missing
Year of death missing
Place of death missing
Cuban House of David players
Cuban Stars (East) players
Pollock's Cuban Stars players
Baseball outfielders
Baseball players from Havana
Cuban expatriate baseball players in the United States